is a stable of sumo wrestlers, one of the Takasago group of stables. It was formed in 1967 and until 2021 was located in Ishiwara, Sumida, Tokyo. As of January 2023 it had 26 sumo wrestlers, four of whom are of sekitori rank. It is the most successful stable in terms of total yūshō won by its wrestlers, with 52.

History
Former yokozuna Chiyonoyama of  Dewanoumi stable had wanted to succeed to the Dewanoumi name, but the then Dewanoumi stablemaster (former wrestler Dewanohana) had already decided to pass the name to former yokozuna Sadanoyama. Accordingly, in January 1967, he set up his own stable, taking with him, amongst others, then ōzeki Kitanofuji and attaching the new stable to the Takasago group of stables.

After Chiyonoyama died in 1977, Kitanofuji, who had already revived Izutsu stable, became the 11th Kokonoe-oyakata, merging his stable with Kokonoe's and giving up the Izutzu elder name. He raised Chiyonofuji, then a makuuchi wrestler, to the great yokozuna he became. Later he also saw Hokutoumi become a yokozuna. Takanofuji and Fujinoshin also reached the top division. 

In 1992, the year after Chiyonofuji retired from the ring, Kitanofuji handed over the stable to him. Chiyonofuji and Kitanofuji swapped names, Chiyonofuji becoming Kokonoe-oyakata and gaining control of the stable, whilst Kitanofuji became Jinmaku-oyakata, attached to Hakkaku stable, set up by the former Hokutoumi in 1993. In the early 1990s Kokonoe stable was one of the largest in sumo but had only one sekitori, Tomoefuji. Kokonoe eventually produced Chiyotenzan, briefly a komusubi in 1999, and long serving ōzeki Chiyotaikai (1999–2009), his most successful wrestler. Following the retirements of Chiyotaikai in January 2010 and Chiyohakuhō in April 2011, the stable had no sekitori for a short time, but Chiyonokuni reached jūryō in July 2011 and the top division in January 2012. Chiyotairyū followed afterwards and reached makuuchi in May 2012. By March 2014, Kokonoe stable was one of the most successful stables in sumo, with three men (Chiyotairyū, Chiyoōtori and Chiyomaru) in the top division and two (Chiyonokuni and Chiyono-ō) in jūryō. In January 2016 the stable moved up to six sekitori with the promotion of Chiyoshōma, the most of any stable. As of September 2020 it remains at six, now level with Kise and one behind new leader Oitekaze.

Chiyonofuji died in July 2016. Sanoyama-oyakata (the former Chiyotaikai) succeeded him as the Kokonoe stablemaster.

In February 2021 Kokonoe stable moved to new premises in Okudo, Katsushika ward. The previous space in Sumida was converted into a restaurant, Chanko Chiyonofuji, named after the late grand champion. The restaurant opened in February 2023 and overlooks the dohyō training space formerly used by the stable. Various trophies won by Chiyonofuji over the years are also displayed.

On 7 February 2023, Kokonoe stable, along with Ōshima stable and Futagoyama stable, signed a partnership and cooperation agreement with the Katsushika Ward of Tokyo. The agreement was presented as having the objective of cooperating further in a wide range of areas, including tourism, culture, sports, and educational promotion, and work closely to revitalize local communities.

Ring name conventions
Traditionally many wrestlers at this stable, often on reaching the sandanme division, take ring names or shikona that begin with the characters 千代 (read: chiyo), meaning "a thousand generations", in deference to the founder, Chiyonoyama and also his later successor Chiyonofuji. As of March 2018, all wrestlers at the stable, including those in the bottom two divisions, have this prefix.

Owners
2016–present: 14th Kokonoe (iin, former ōzeki Chiyotaikai Ryūji)
1992-2016: 13th Kokonoe  (former Chiyonofuji Mitsugu, the 58th yokozuna)
1977-1992: 12th Kokonoe (former Kitanofuji Katsuaki, the 52nd yokozuna)
1967-1977: 11th Kokonoe (former Chiyonoyama Masanobu, the 41st yokozuna)

Notable active wrestlers

Chiyoshōma (best rank maegashira)
Chiyomaru (best rank maegashira)
Chiyonokuni (best rank maegashira)
 (best rank maegashira)
 (best rank jūryō)
Chiyoarashi (best rank jūryō)
 (best rank jūryō)

Coach
Tanigawa Hideki (shunin, former sekiwake Hokutōriki)
Ōyama Yūki (toshiyori, former komusubi Chiyoōtori)

Notable former members
Kitanofuji (the 52nd yokozuna)
Chiyonofuji (the 58th yokozuna)
Hokutoumi (the 61st yokozuna)
Chiyotaikai (former ōzeki)
Kitaseumi (former sekiwake)
Chiyotairyū (former komusubi)
Chiyotenzan (former komusubi)
Takanofuji (former komusubi)
Tomoefuji (former komusubi)

Referees
3rd Kimura Yōdō (san'yaku gyōji, real name Yūji Horasawa)
Kimura Kōnosuke (san'yaku gyōji, real name Toshiaki Kojima)
Kimura Ryunosuke (jonidan gyōji, real name Haruto Kajita)

Ushers
Shigeo (san'yaku yobidashi, real name Takumi Taniguchi) 
Shigetarō (jūryō yobidashi, real name Katsunori Hattori)
Shigejiro (sandanme yobidashi, real name Keisuke Miyagi)

Hairdressers
Tokotake (1st class tokoyama)
Tokokyū (2nd class tokoyama)

Location and access
1-21-14 Okudo, Katsushika ward, Tokyo
20-minute walk from Shin-Koiwa Station (Sōbu Line Local and Rapid)

See also 
Kokonoe-oyakata
List of active sumo wrestlers
List of past sumo wrestlers
Glossary of sumo terms
List of sumo stables

References

External links 

Official site 
Japan Sumo Association profile
Article on Kokonoe stable

Active sumo stables